Marat Ataýewiç Nyýazow (28 September 1933 – 8 April 2009) was a Soviet and Turkmen sport shooter. He won a silver medal at the 1960 Summer Olympics in the 50 metre rifle three positions event and finished in ninth place in the 50 metre rifle prone.

Between 1958 and 1966 he won six gold, 10 silver and three bronze medals at the world championships. He set a world record in 1958 and won a European title in rifle in 1959. Nationally, he won nine titles, in 1957, 1958, 1963, 1964, 1966 and 1968. After retirement he worked as a coach in his native Ashgabat. For his achievements he was awarded the Order of the Red Banner of Labour.

References

1933 births
2009 deaths
Soviet male sport shooters
Turkmenistan male sport shooters
Olympic shooters of the Soviet Union
Shooters at the 1960 Summer Olympics
Olympic silver medalists for the Soviet Union
Olympic medalists in shooting
Sportspeople from Ashgabat
Medalists at the 1960 Summer Olympics
Honoured Masters of Sport of the USSR